Jawad Ali (1907–1987) was an Iraqi historian and academic specializing in Islamic and Arabic history. He received his doctorate from Hamburg University in 1939 and is known for his book, The history of the Arabs before Islam which became one of the most referenced works on the history of Arabs before Islam. Jawad Ali worked in the Department of History at the Faculty of Education at the University of Baghdad beginning in the 1950s.

References 

1907 births
1987 deaths
20th-century Iraqi historians
University of Hamburg alumni
Academic staff of the University of Baghdad
Pre-Islamic Arabia
Members of Academy of the Arabic Language in Cairo